KTVR may refer to:

 KTVR Vijaydeepa Group, a construction & healthcare business corporate group based at Coimbatore, India
 KTVR Knowledge Park for Engineering and Technology, an engineering college (A Unit of KTVR Vijaydeepa Group) in Coimbatore, India
 KTVR Creative Reels, Film Production house (A Unit of KTVR Vijaydeepa Group),Coimbatore, Inda
 KTVR-FM, a radio station (90.3 FM) licensed to La Grande, Oregon, United States
 KTVR (TV), a television station (channel 13 analog/5 digital) licensed to La Grande, Oregon, United States
 Vicksburg - Tallulah Regional Airport, an airport in northeastern Louisiana